Dhandayuthapani Pillai was an Indian politician and former Member of the Legislative Assembly of Tamil Nadu. He was elected to the Tamil Nadu legislative assembly as an Indian National Congress candidate from Adirampattinam constituency in  1962 election.

References 

Indian National Congress politicians from Tamil Nadu
Living people
Year of birth missing (living people)